Jonathan Javier Rodríguez Portillo (born 6 July 1993), commonly known by his nickname Cabecita, is a Uruguayan professional footballer who plays as a forward for Liga MX club América and the Uruguay national team.

Club career

Peñarol
Born in Florida, Uruguay, Rodríguez began his career with local club Peñarol in Uruguayan Primera División. In his first season, he scored 0 goals in 27 matches. He also made appearances for the club in Copa Libertadores.

Benfica
On 29 January 2015, Rodríguez joined Portuguese champions S.L. Benfica on a loan deal until 30 June 2017. Penãrol's president, Juan Pedro Damiani, said that Benfica paid €2 million for 40% of Rodríguez's economic rights, with the remaining 60% totalling €4.4 million. Rodríguez joined Benfica along with countryman Elbio Álvarez, a former Peñarol player.

On 22 February 2015, Rodríguez debuted for Benfica B and scored twice in a home win against Oriental (3–0) in Segunda Liga. On 18 March, he scored a hat-trick in a home win against Portimonense (4–1). On 11 April 2015, Rodríguez debuted for the first-team, as a substitute, in a home win against Académica (5–1) in Primeira Liga.

On 20 August 2015, Rodríguez was loaned out to Deportivo de La Coruña for one season. He made 13 league appearances throughout the duration of the loan, the first of which was a stint off the bench replacing Juanfran in a 1-1 draw with Valencia.

Santos Laguna
On 10 June 2016, he signed for Mexican club Santos Laguna on a permanent deal. Rodríguez made his competitive debut for the club on 18 July 2016, playing the entirety of a 1-1 draw with Tigres. He scored his first goal for the club a week and a half later, converting a penalty in the 19th minute of a 1-1 draw with FC Juárez in the Copa MX. The 2017–18 season was Rodríguez's most prolific with the club, as he scored 16 goals across all competitions.

Al-Nassr
On 11 January 2022, Rodríguez joined Saudi Arabia club Al-Nassr.

América
On 20 June 2022, Rodríguez returned to Mexico and joined Club América on a permanent transfer.

International career
Rodríguez scored his first international goal for Uruguay in a 3–0 victory over Oman on 13 October 2014.

Career statistics

International

Scores and results list Uruguay's goal tally first.

Honours
Benfica
Primeira Liga: 2014–15

Santos Laguna
Liga MX: Clausura 2018

Cruz Azul
Liga MX: Guardianes 2021
Campeón de Campeones: 2021
Supercopa MX: 2019
Leagues Cup: 2019

Individual
Liga MX Balón de Oro: 2020–21
Liga MX Golden Boot: Guardianes 2020
Liga MX Best XI: Guardianes 2020, Guardianes 2021
Liga MX Player of the Month: September 2020, March 2021
Liga MX Best Forward: 2020–21
Liga MX All-Star: 2021

References

External links
 
 
 
 
 

1993 births
Living people
People from Florida Department
Uruguayan footballers
Association football forwards
Peñarol players
S.L. Benfica B players
S.L. Benfica footballers
Deportivo de La Coruña players
Santos Laguna footballers
Cruz Azul footballers
Al Nassr FC players
Uruguayan Primera División players
Liga Portugal 2 players
Primeira Liga players
La Liga players
Liga MX players
Saudi Professional League players
Uruguay international footballers
2015 Copa América players
2019 Copa América players
Uruguayan expatriate footballers
Uruguayan expatriate sportspeople in Portugal
Expatriate footballers in Portugal
Uruguayan expatriate sportspeople in Spain
Expatriate footballers in Spain
Uruguayan expatriate sportspeople in Mexico
Expatriate footballers in Mexico
Uruguayan expatriate sportspeople in Saudi Arabia
Expatriate footballers in Saudi Arabia